The 2004 Korean League Cup, also known as the 2004 Samsung Hauzen Cup, was the 17th competition of the Korean League Cup.

Table

Result

Top scorers

Awards

Source:

See also
2004 in South Korean football
2004 K League
2004 Korean FA Cup

References

External links
Official website
RSSSF

2004
2004
Korean League Cup
Korean League Cup